Melike Hatun Mosque is a mosque in Ankara, Turkey. It was opened to service on 27 September 2017.

Melike Hatun
The mosque is named after Melike Hatun (not to be confused with Melike Mama Hatun). Nothing definite is known about Melike Hatun, except that she was a wealthy 14th-century lady. According to Professor  Hüseyin Çınar of the Yıldırım Beyazıt University, she was probably the daughter of Kayqubad III, the Anatolian Seljuks sultan (r. 1298–1302). She was the commissioner of many public buildings in Ankara. She was also the supporter of Hacı Bayram-ı Veli.

The mosque
The mosque is in the old quarter of Ankara, popularly known as Hergele Meydanı. It is situated to the east of Atatürk Boulevard and Gençlik Parkı, the largest public park in Ankara. Its architect is  Hilmi Şenalp.

It has enough room for 7000 prayers. It is a four-minaret mosque.

References

2017 establishments in Turkey
Mosques in Ankara
Mosques completed in 2017
Mosque buildings with domes
Ulus District
Altındağ, Ankara
21st-century religious buildings and structures in Turkey